Comdr. Thomas MacDonough House, also known as The Trap, is a historic home located near Odessa, New Castle County, Delaware.  It was built in several sections.  The two main sections are two stories and consists of a three bay brick section dated to the mid-18th century and a three bay frame section built between 1820 and 1830. Later-19th century additions to the house include frame one-and -story wings to the south gable end wall and southwest rear wall.  Also on the property is a contributing farm building complex, including a shed, root cellar, and privy. It was the home of Commander Thomas MacDonough (1783-1825), an early-19th-century American naval officer noted for his roles in the First Barbary War and the War of 1812.

It was listed on the National Register of Historic Places in 1978.

References

Houses on the National Register of Historic Places in Delaware
Houses completed in 1814
Houses in New Castle County, Delaware
National Register of Historic Places in New Castle County, Delaware